Mataja is a surname. Notable people with the surname include:

Heinrich Mataja (1877–1937), Austrian lawyer and politician
Mario Mataja (born 1967), Bosnian-Herzegovinian footballer